Dimitar Krushovski (born 12 July 1979) is a Bulgarian former footballer who played as a defender. He is the current manager of Bansko.

Coaching career
Krushovski started his coaching career at Pirin Gotse Delchev. On 3 July 2017, he was appointed as manager of Bansko.

References

External links

1979 births
Living people
Bulgarian footballers
Association football defenders
PFC Pirin Gotse Delchev players
First Professional Football League (Bulgaria) players